"That's What Love Can Do" is a hit song by American female pop group Boy Krazy. The song was written and produced by British hitmaking team Stock Aitken Waterman, and first released in 1991 as Boy Krazy's debut single. Lead vocals were performed by group member Johnna Cummings. This was the only single in which group member Renée Veneziale would be involved in, leaving the band in 1991 soon after its release. The song did not become a hit, peaking at #86 in the UK.

At the end of 1992, the song became successful in North American nightclubs, and radio airplay soon followed, prompting a re-release in early 1993. For this reissue, the song was remixed (the radio edit being an edit of the Hot Tracks remix, which was popular at nightclubs). The song was a success this time round, becoming the group's signature song, and peaking at #18 in the Billboard Hot 100. It also reached #1 in Pop airplay on the Radio & Records CHR/Pop chart, and #2 on the Top 40 Mainstream chart. Excluding songs that charted after the Hot 100 rule changed to allow airplay-only songs to be eligible to chart, "That's What Love Can Do" is the lowest-peaking song on the Hot 100 that went #1 in Pop airplay on the Radio and Records chart. In the UK it was still not a big hit, peaking at #80.

The B-side on both releases was a cover of "One Thing Leads to Another", originally by the SAW-produced boyband Yell!. The lyrics were slightly rewritten on Boy Krazy's version to reflect the gender change. The original 1991 release featured Renée Veneziale singing the second verse, this was re-recorded by Josselyne Jones in the 1993 version, which can be found on the 1993 single and the Boy Krazy album.

"That's What Love Can Do" was also recorded by Samantha Fox, who recorded the song for her Just One Night album from 1991. However, the song was not completed in 1991 and was left unfinished. It was released with an additional 2012 production on the Just One Night Deluxe Edition in June 2012.

In 1993, the Japanese female group Giri Giri Girls released a Japanese-language cover of the song, entitled "Your Cool Shore" (あなたの事ですずしい渚  Anata no koto de suzushii nagisa).

In 1999 Pete Waterman produced a remake of "That's What Love Can Do" performed by session singers Cheryl (aka Sheryl) Jay (lead), Vicky Dowdall (later in Girls@Play), and Nikki Wheeler and credited to Toutes Les Filles. The track was issued in August 1999 and, promoted by a video mostly shot on the Spanish seaside and also by numerous television spots, "That's What Love Can Do" by Toutes Les Filles charted higher in the UK than the Boy Krazy original while still failing to become a major hit peaking at #44. The television promo for the single included an appearance by Toutes Les Filles on a program hosted by Jonathan Wilkes who maintained contact with group member Nikki Wheeler with the couple eventually marrying.

Video 

Three videos were filmed:

The 1991 video has the girls in a revolving scenario, the five girls sitting in swivel chairs, radiators, and also holding an electric fan or on a phone
booth, among other things.

The 1993 American video shows the girls in a bar, intercut with some scenes of the girls choreographing the song.

The 1993 British video mixed both previous video clips (with Renée Veneziale edited out of the parts containing the original video), with additional footage from the 1993 American video in it.

Charts

Weekly charts

Year-end charts

References

External links

1991 singles
1993 singles
1999 singles
Song recordings produced by Stock Aitken Waterman
Songs written by Mike Stock (musician)
Songs written by Matt Aitken
Songs written by Pete Waterman
1991 songs
PolyGram singles